Christian Jorge Osinaga Viruez (born 21 January 2004) is a Bolivian football player who plays as central defender.

Club career
Born in Santa Cruz de la Sierra, Osinaga began his career with a social project in his hometown, Proyecto Bolivia 2022, before joining the youth categories of Brazilian club Santos in 2018, along with compatriots Miguel Terceros and Enzo Monteiro. On 15 January 2022, he was loaned to Bolívar back in his home country for one year, with a buyout clause.

Osinaga made his first team – and División de Fútbol Profesional – debut on 7 August 2022, starting in a 2–1 away loss against Nacional Potosí.

Personal life
Osinaga's father Marco was also a footballer. A forward, he came to proeminence at Destroyers but had to retire at the age of 24 due to injuries.

Career statistics

References

External links
 

2004 births
Living people
Sportspeople from Santa Cruz de la Sierra
Bolivian footballers
Bolivia youth international footballers
Association football defenders
Bolivian Primera División players
Club Bolívar players
Bolivian expatriate footballers
Bolivian expatriates in Brazil
Expatriate footballers in Brazil